The Cabinet of Kuwait is the chief executive body of the State of Kuwait. The following cabinet is the 34th in the history of Kuwait. It was formed on 10 December 2016, after the previous Cabinet resigned on 28 November 2016. The Cabinet resigned on 30 October 2017.

See also
Cabinet of Kuwait

References

External links
Official English names of Kuwaiti ministers and ministries (Kuwaiti Government)

Kuwait
Government of Kuwait